The Lake of the Woods State Forest is a state forest located south of Lake of the Woods in Beltrami, Koochiching, Lake of the Woods and Roseau counties in Minnesota, USA. The forest borders the Pine Island State Forest to the east and the Beltrami Island State Forest to the west. 

Outdoor recreational activities include boating, canoeing, kayaking and fishing. Hunting for small game and white-tailed deer is popular in the fall and trails are designated for snowmobiling in the winter. Camping facilities are available at Beltrami Island State Forest and the nearby Zippel Bay State Park.

See also
List of Minnesota state forests

External links
Lake of the Woods State Forest - Minnesota Department of Natural Resources (DNR)

References

Minnesota state forests
Protected areas of Beltrami County, Minnesota
Protected areas of Koochiching County, Minnesota
Protected areas of Lake of the Woods County, Minnesota
Protected areas of Roseau County, Minnesota
1990 establishments in Minnesota
Protected areas established in 1990